Nibricoccus is a Gram-negative, strictly aerobic and non-motile genus of bacteria from the family of Opitutaceae with one known species (Nibricoccus aquaticus). Nibricoccus aquaticus has been isolated from hyporheic freshwater from Korea.

References

 

Verrucomicrobiota
Bacteria genera
Monotypic bacteria genera
Taxa described in 2019